Andrew Henry Robertson  (born 11 March 1994) is a Scottish professional footballer who plays as a left-back for  club Liverpool and captains the Scotland national team. Known for his vision, athleticism and physical power, Robertson is often considered to be one of the best full-backs in the world.

Robertson began his senior career with Queen's Park in 2012 before joining Dundee United a year later. His performance during his first season as a professional led to him being named PFA Scotland Young Player of the Year and also making his international debut. He joined Hull City in July 2014 for a fee of £2.85 million. Robertson played for Hull in three seasons, being relegated, promoted and relegated in consecutive years. 

He joined Liverpool in July 2017 for an undisclosed fee, believed to be an initial £8 million. Robertson has won several honours during his time with Liverpool, including the Champions League in 2019 and the Premier League in 2020. For his performances in the 2018–19 Premier League season, he was named in the PFA Team of the Year. 

Robertson made his full international debut for Scotland in May 2014, and was appointed Scotland captain in September 2018. He represented the side at UEFA Euro 2020.

Early life and career
Robertson was born in Glasgow and was a childhood Celtic fan. His father Brian, nicknamed 'Pop', who grew up in the Maryhill area (specifically the Wyndford estate where he was a childhood friend of footballers Jim Duffy and Charlie Nicholas), was a keen amateur player, although a spinal injury requiring him to wear a back brace prevented him from pursuing sport as a career.

He attended St Ninian's High School in Giffnock, East Renfrewshire, from 2006 to 2012, where he captained the football team. A talented golfer, he was also the junior captain of his local golf club in Glasgow. He also played for Giffnock Soccer Centre, and joined Celtic as a youth, but was released at under-15 level because he was considered to be too small. He then signed for Queen's Park.

Club career

Queen's Park
Focusing on his studies, Robertson was on the brink of starting university at undergraduate degree level before he was called up to the Queen's Park first team at the beginning of the 2012–13 season. He made his debut for the club in the Scottish Challenge Cup in a penalty shoot out win against Berwick Rangers, and went on to make a total of forty appearances during the season, helping the club to a third-place finish in the 2012–13 Scottish Third Division. His first goal for the club came in a 2–1 defeat to East Stirlingshire on 13 November 2012.

Dundee United
Robertson signed for Scottish Premiership side Dundee United, along with Queen's Park teammate Aidan Connolly, on 3 June 2013; he took the squad place of the departing Barry Douglas who had made the same move three years earlier. Having been ignored in their requests for a transfer fee for Douglas, Queen's Park (an amateur club) protested at the prospect of more players departing to United for nothing and eventually agreed a deal involving a percentage of future transfers, which would later prove beneficial.

Robertson immediately became part of manager Jackie McNamara's first team plans, making his debut for the club on the opening day of the season in a 0–0 draw with Partick Thistle. On 22 September 2013, Robertson scored his first goal for Dundee United, in a 2–2 draw against Motherwell. He ran from his own half before sending a low left-foot drive in to the goal from 22 yards. Soon afterwards he agreed a new contract with United, until May 2016. He was voted SPFL young player of the month for September 2013 and player of the month for November 2013. On 12 April 2014, Robertson played in the Scottish Cup Semi-final against Rangers at Ibrox, which United won 3–1. In April 2014, Robertson won the PFA Scotland Young Player of the Year award and was also named in the PFA Scotland Team of the Year for the 2013–14 Scottish Premiership. His last appearance for United was as they lost the 2014 Scottish Cup Final to St Johnstone.

Hull City

In July 2014, Dundee United accepted an offer of £2.85 million for Robertson from English Premier League club Hull City. The transfer was completed on 29 July, as Robertson signed a three-year contract with Hull. As Stan Ternent, Hull City's chief scout explained, "I'd been looking at Stuart Armstrong but [Robertson] was the no brainer … he'd a history with Celtic and he was always a determined lad given how he'd recovered from his setbacks. You could see straight away he had ability and he can only get better."

He made his competitive debut on the opening day of the season in a 1–0 victory away to Queens Park Rangers, in which he made a goal-line clearance. Robertson quickly settled at Hull and established himself in the side, winning the club's Player of the Month award for August 2014. He made 24 appearances in his debut season at the KC Stadium, but was unable to prevent the team from being relegated to the Championship.

Despite the release of several other first-team players, Robertson opted to stay at City. His first goal for the club came on 3 November 2015 away to Brentford where he opened the scoring in a 2–0 win to put Hull top of the Championship table on goal difference. He started the 2016 Championship play-off Final against Sheffield Wednesday, which Hull won 1–0 to secure promotion to the Premier League. The team spent just one season back in the top flight, however, before being relegated again.

Robertson and fellow Hull defender Harry Maguire were recommended by Everton scout Steve Walsh to transfer in a combined £20 million deal, but Everton rejected the proposal.

Liverpool

On 21 July 2017, Robertson signed a long-term deal with Liverpool for an initial fee of £8 million. On 19 August, he made his debut in a 1–0 win over Crystal Palace, winning the Man of the Match award. Robertson started the 2017–18 season as understudy to Alberto Moreno, but got a run of games when the Spaniard was injured in December. His performance in the 4–3 victory against league leaders Manchester City on 14 January earned praise from the Liverpool supporters. He scored his first goal for the club on the final match day of the 2017–18 season against Brighton & Hove Albion in a 4–0 victory.

Robertson continued to play regularly for Liverpool during the 2018–19 season when Liverpool were runners-up in the Premier League. He signed a new contract with the club in January 2019, which is due to run until 2024. He has been hailed as the best left back in the Premier League by Kevin Kilbane and the best left back in the world by Phil Neville. Over the course of the 2018-19 Premier League season, Robertson registered 11 assists. On 25 April, he was named in the PFA Team of the Year alongside Liverpool teammates, Trent Alexander-Arnold, Sadio Mané and Virgil van Dijk.

On 1 June 2019, Robertson played the full 90 minutes of the Champions League final as Liverpool beat Tottenham Hotspur to secure their sixth European Cup. He became the first Scot to win the tournament since Darren Fletcher (an unused substitute in 2008) and the first to actually be on the field in a winning team since Paul Lambert in 1997.

In the European champions' first home game of the Champions League for the 2019–20 campaign on 2 October, Robertson scored his first European goal in a dramatic 4–3 victory against Red Bull Salzburg. On 2 November 2019, Robertson scored his second Premier League goal for Liverpool, equalising in the 87th minute against Aston Villa, with Liverpool eventually winning 2–1 in stoppage time.

Over the course of the 2019–20 domestic campaign, Robertson contributed 2 goals and 12 assists for Liverpool.

On 24 August 2021, Robertson signed a new long-term contract with Liverpool.

During the 2022–23 season, Robertson became the defender with most assists in Premier League history.

International career

Robertson was first selected by the Scotland under-21 team in October 2013. He made his debut as a substitute in a 2–1 win against Slovakia. Robertson was selected for the under-21 team in November 2015, as the full national team did not have a fixture.

Robertson was first named in the full Scotland squad for a friendly against Poland on 5 March 2014. He came on as a substitute in the second half, as Scotland won 1–0 in Warsaw. Scotland manager Gordon Strachan said afterwards "Andy came on there and the first time he picked it up he drove about 30 yards. I thought 'that's fantastic'. Absolutely no grey area, I'm going to do what I do. I loved seeing that first touch." Robertson made his first start for the national team in a 2–2 draw with Nigeria on 28 May 2014.

Robertson scored his first international goal in a friendly against England at Celtic Park in November 2014, scoring Scotland's only goal as they were beaten 3–1.

On 3 September 2018, Robertson was appointed as Scotland captain by manager Alex McLeish. After a 2–1 defeat against Israel in October 2018, Robertson said that both he and fellow left-back Kieran Tierney were being played out of position in the 3–5–2 system adopted by McLeish to accommodate both players.

In a UEFA Euro 2020 qualifier against Cyprus on 8 June 2019, Robertson scored the opening goal of the game with a long-range strike. Scotland eventually won 2–1. In November, he was one of five Scotland players to withdraw from the national squad due to injury.

In November 2020, with Robertson again as captain, Scotland qualified for UEFA Euro 2020 following a 5–4 win on penalties against Serbia. It was Scotland's first major tournament appearance since 1998, ending a 22-year streak of not qualifying. On 14 June 2021, Robertson captained Scotland in their first game of Euro 2020, but ended up on the losing side as the Scots lost 2–0 to the Czech Republic. Scotland were knocked out at the group stage, having lost to the Czechs and Croatia either side of a goalless draw with England.

In September of that year, Robertson won his 50th cap and thereby joined the Scottish FA International Roll of Honour. In his next appearance he led the team to a 1–0 away win over Austria; among his teammates was debutant substitute Paul McGinn who last played alongside Robertson almost nine years earlier, when they were with Queen's Park in the fourth tier of Scottish football (he had been reunited at international level with another Queen's Park colleague, Lawrence Shankland, in 2019).

Style of play
Since joining Liverpool, Robertson has been considered one of the best left-backs in world football, Fábio Aurélio, a predecessor for Liverpool in the same position, singled out Robertson for praise, saying "One thing that calls my attention is that he's always improving, he's not comfortable in his situation being first choice," and that "The two full-backs of Liverpool right now are unbelievable. We can contest in any kind of way."

Former Liverpool captain Sir Kenny Dalglish has said "For me, there are few, if any, better than him in his position."

Personal life
Robertson is a practising Roman Catholic. He is married to Rachel Roberts, being wed in the summer of 2022. Roberts gave birth to their son, Rocco, on 26 August 2017. In January 2019, the couple welcomed their second child and first daughter, Aria. Robertson is of Irish descent through his Glenfarne-born grandmother.

In March 2018, Robertson donated a signed Liverpool shirt of his teammate Roberto Firmino to a young boy who had given his pocket money to a local food bank. The Sunday Times reported in March 2020 that Robertson had donated significant sums to food banks in the Glasgow area.

In September 2020, Robertson released his first book, Robbo: Now You're Gonna Believe Us, which mainly focuses on Liverpool's 2019–20 campaign. All proceeds from the book go to Robertson's foundation, which helps underprivileged children in Scotland.

In November 2020, he and fellow Liverpool full-back Trent Alexander-Arnold began starring in their own digital series on IGTV called Wingmen.

Robertson was appointed Member of the Order of the British Empire (MBE) in the 2023 New Year Honours for services to association football, charity and young people.

Career statistics

Club

International

Scotland score listed first, score column indicates score after each Robertson goal.

Honours
Hull City
Football League Championship play-offs: 2016

Liverpool
Premier League: 2019–20
FA Cup: 2021–22
EFL Cup: 2021–22
FA Community Shield: 2022
UEFA Champions League: 2018–19
UEFA Super Cup: 2019
FIFA Club World Cup: 2019

Individual
PFA Scotland Young Player of the Year: 2013–14
PFA Scotland Team of the Year: 2013–14
SPFL Player of the Month: November 2013
SPFL Young Player of the Month: September 2013
PFA Team of the Year: 2018–19 Premier League, 2019–20 Premier League
UEFA Champions League Breakthrough XI: 2018
UEFA Champions League Squad of the Season: 2018–19
UEFA Champions League Team of the Season: 2021–22
UEFA Team of the Year: 2019
ESM Team of the Year: 2019–20
MBE

See also
List of Scotland national football team captains

References

External links

Profile at the Liverpool F.C. website
Profile at the Scottish Football Association website

1994 births
Living people
Footballers from Glasgow
Scottish footballers
Association football defenders
Queen's Park F.C. players
Dundee United F.C. players
Hull City A.F.C. players
Liverpool F.C. players
Scottish Football League players
Scottish Professional Football League players
Premier League players
English Football League players
UEFA Champions League winning players
Scotland under-21 international footballers
Scotland international footballers
UEFA Euro 2020 players
People educated at St Ninian's High School, Giffnock
Scottish Roman Catholics
Scottish people of Irish descent
Scottish memoirists
FA Cup Final players
Members of the Order of the British Empire